The 1896 United States presidential election in Texas took place on November 3, 1896. All contemporary 45 states were part of the 1896 United States presidential election. State voters chose 15 electors to the Electoral College, which selected the president and vice president.

Texas was won by the Democratic nominees, former U.S. Representative William Jennings Bryan of Nebraska and his running mate Arthur Sewall of Maine. Four electors cast their vice presidential ballots for Thomas E. Watson.

Bryan would later win Texas again in both 1900 and 1908.

Results

See also
 United States presidential elections in Texas

Notes

References

Texas
1896
1896 Texas elections